was a town located in Kitamatsuura District, Nagasaki Prefecture, Japan.

As of 2003, the town had an estimated population of 7,829 and a density of 226.21 persons per km². The total area was 34.61 km².

On October 1, 2005, Tabira, along with the town of Ikitsuki, and the village of Ōshima (all from Kitamatsuura District), was merged into the expanded city of Hirado. Its top attraction is Tabira Insect Park.

Geography 
 Mountains: Mount Fukiage
 Islands: Yokoshima - uninhabited island off the coast of Kamata Harbor (inhabited until 1981).
 Rivers: Kubuki river
 Dams: Kubuki dam

Adjacent municipalities 
 Matsuura
 Sasebo

History

Development 
 April 1, 1889—The villages of Tabira and Minamitabira were established.
 April 1, 1954—The villages of Tabira and Minamitabira village were merged and incorporated as the town of Tabira.
 October 1, 2005—Dissolved and merged with Hirado, Ikitsuki, and Ōshima into the expanded city of Hirado.

Administrations 
Former Mayors
Waseda Tsuguo （4/20/1954 - 4/19/1958）
Kajikawa Zaiki（4/20/1958 - 4/19/1982）
Inazawa Kenji（4/20/1982 - 4/19/1998）
Yamasaki Yuuji（4/20/1998 - 9/30/2005）

Education system 
 Tabira Kita Elementary School
 Tabira Higashi Elementary School
 Tabira minami Elementary School
 Tabira Middle School :ja:平戸市立田平中学校
 Nagasaki Pref. Kitamatsuura Agricultural Senior High School :ja:長崎県立北松農業高等学校

Transportation system

Airports 
Nearest airport within Nagasaki Prefecture is Nagasaki Airport in Ōmura.

Railroads 
 Nishi-Kyūshū Line
 Main station：Tabira-Hiradoguchi Station
 Other stations in town：Higashi-Tabira Station - Naka-Tabira Station :ja:中田平駅 - Tabira-Hiradoguchi Station - Nishi-Tabira Station

Highways 
No express ways
Nearest interchange is the Nishi-Kyūshū Expressway :ja:西九州自動車道 - Ainoura Nakazato Interchange :ja:相浦中里インターチェンジ。

Toll Roads 
 Hirado Bridge（free of charge since April 1, 2010）

National Highways 
 Japan National Route 204
 Roadside Station：Hometown of the Insects - Tabira 
 Japan National Route 383

Prefectural Roads 
Nagasaki Prefectural Road 221 Iyoshi Tabira Harbor Line :ja:長崎県道221号以善田平港線

Historic sites, Sightseeing spots, Festivals 
 Satoda Historic Ruins :ja:里田原遺跡
 Tabira Chapel :ja:田平天主堂
 Tabira Park
 Tabira Insect Park :ja:たびら昆虫自然園, 
 Hirado Bridge

Dissolved municipalities of Nagasaki Prefecture